Mihona is a town and a Nagar Panchayat in Bhind district in the Indian state of Madhya Pradesh.

Geography
It has an average elevation of 154 metres (505 feet).

Demographics
 India census, Mihona had a population of 14,799. Males constitute 53% of the population and females 47%. Mihona has an average literacy rate of 65%, higher than the national average of 59.5%: male literacy is 74%, and female literacy is 55%. In Mihona, 15% of the population is under 6 years of age.

Administration
The civic administration of the town is managed by the Mihona Nagar Panchayat and the town is divided into 15 wards.

References

Cities and towns in Bhind district